

Biography
He was born in Cholet and became an etcher and decorative painter of interiors. Today many of his works have been dismantled from their original installations and are remounted as moveable paintings on display in galleries.
He died in Paris.

References

Pierre-Charles Trémolières on Artnet

External links

1703 births
1739 deaths
18th-century French painters
French male painters
People from Cholet
18th-century French male artists